Deh Khoda or Dehkhoda may refer to:
 Dehkhoda, Chaharmahal and Bakhtiari
 Dehkhoda, Hormozgan
 Dehkhoda, Mazandaran
 Deh Khoda, Semnan